Cheng San is a precinct located at Ang Mo Kio, Singapore. It has precincts of Neighbourhood 5. The nearest MRT stations are Ang Mo Kio and Yio Chu Kang.

Politics
Cheng San is part of Ang Mo Kio Group Representation Constituency. The division is named Cheng San-Seletar from the 2020 elections onwards and the MP is Nadia Ahmad Samdin. Cheng San was formerly under the SMC of the same name, and the hotly contested GRC of the same name, dissolved in the 2001 elections. The division also bounds Seletar as well.

References

 
North Region, Singapore